"Should Be Higher" is a song by the English electronic band Depeche Mode from their thirteenth studio album, Delta Machine. The song was written by Dave Gahan and Kurt Uenala. It was released as the album's third single on 11 October 2013 in Germany, and 
14 October 2013 in the UK and France. The release date for North America was 15 October 2013. It's the third Depeche Mode single co-written by lead singer Dave Gahan.

It debuted at number 81 in the UK Singles Chart on 20 October 2013 and has hit the Top 20 in 3 countries.

Music video
The video for the song, directed by Anton Corbijn, premiered on Vevo on 22 August 2013. The video comprises live footage from the Delta Machine Tour shows in Berlin, Leipzig, and Munich.

Track listings 
These are the following listings for every release of Should Be Higher.

Charts

References

External links
 Single information from the official Depeche Mode web site

2013 singles
Columbia Records singles
Depeche Mode songs
Music videos directed by Anton Corbijn
Songs written by Dave Gahan
Song recordings produced by Ben Hillier
2013 songs